The 1966 Lafayette Leopards football team was an American football team that represented Lafayette College during the 1966 NCAA College Division football season. Lafayette tied for fourth in the Middle Atlantic Conference, University Division, and placed second in the Middle Three Conference.

In their fourth and final year under head coach Kenneth Bunn, the Leopards compiled a 3–6 record. Gary Marshall was the team captain.

At 2–3 against MAC University Division foes, Lafayette tied Bucknell for fourth place in the seven-team circuit. Lafayette went 1–1 against the Middle Three, losing to Rutgers and beating Lehigh.

Lafayette played its home games at Fisher Field on College Hill in Easton, Pennsylvania.

Schedule

References

Lafayette
Lafayette
Lafayette Leopards football seasons
Lafayette Leopards football